The Creatures of Prometheus, Op. 43, is a ballet composed in 1801 by Ludwig van Beethoven following the libretto of Salvatore Viganò. The ballet premiered on 28 March 1801 at the Burgtheater in Vienna and was given 28 performances. It was premiered in New York at the Park Theatre on 14 June 1808 being one of the first full length works by Beethoven to be performed in the United States. It is the only full length ballet by Beethoven.

History 
Viganò was tasked with presenting a work to the Archduchess Maria Theresa at the Vienna Court Theatre (Burgtheater), and chose the subject matter of Prometheus in an allegorical sense. While Viganò usually composed his own music for his performances, he felt this performance was far too important and asked Beethoven to compose instead. The ballet was written in two acts, with Beethoven creating an overture, an introduction, fifteen numbers, and a finale.

Summary 
The ballet is an allegory based on the mythical story of Prometheus, who stole fire from Zeus in order to create mankind from clay. In the ballet, Prometheus finds mankind in a state of ignorance and decides to introduce the ideas of science and art to them, largely based on Beethoven's own support of the Enlightenment movement. Prometheus introduces the humans to Apollo, the god of the arts, who commands Amphion, Arion and Orpheus to teach music, and Melpomene and Thalia to teach tragedy and comedy. The humans also meet with Terpsichore who, along with Pan, introduces them to the Pastoral Dance, followed by Dionysus introducing his Heroic Dance.

In 1930, musicologist Jean Chantavoine and playwright Maurice Léna made a detailed reconstruction of the plot in relation to the music, based on sources that have stood the test of time. A summary of this reconstruction is given below.

Music and reconstruction of the plot 
Overture

Act 1 opens with an introduction, followed by three numbers.

Act 2 includes another 13 numbers:

According to musicologist Lewis Lockwood, Beethoven's music for this ballet is "easier and lighter than music for the concert hall ... [I]t shows Beethoven exploiting instruments and coloristic orchestral effects that would never appear in his symphonies or serious dramatic overtures." Beethoven later based the fourth movement of his Eroica symphony and his Eroica Variations (piano) on the main theme of the last movement (Finale) of this ballet.

The ballet requires the use of harp and basset horn among the orchestral instruments, instruments Beethoven rarely employed.

See also
 Prometheus in other musical works

References

External links 
 
 
 

1801 compositions
1801 ballet premieres
Prometheus
Silenus
Dionysus
Works based on classical mythology
Ballets by Ludwig van Beethoven